Elections to Sheffield City Council were held on 5 May 1988. One third of the council was up for election.

Election result

This result had the following consequences for the total number of seats on the Council after the elections:

Ward results

Sid Cordle was a sitting councillor for Ecclesall ward

Phyllis Smith was a sitting councillor for Heeley ward

Jimmy Boyce was a sitting councillor for Burngreave ward

Alf Meade was a sitting councillor for Hillsborough ward

References

1988 English local elections
1988
1980s in Sheffield